Grevillea adenotricha is a species of flowering plant in the family Proteaceae and is endemic to the north of Western Australia. It is a shrub with narrowly oblong leaves with serrated edges, and red flowers with an orange style.

Description

Taxonomy
Grevillea adenotricha was first formally described in 1986 by Donald McGillivray in his book New Names in Grevillea (Proteaceae), based on plant material collected from Manning Gorge in 1973. The specific epithet (adenotricha) means "gland-hair".

Distribution and habitat
This grevillea grows on sandstone outcrops and is only known from the Manning Gorge, lushington Brook and Prince Regent River areas of the Kimberley region of northern Western Australia.

Conservation status
Grevillea adenotricha is listed as "Priority Four" by the Government of Western Australia Department of Biodiversity, Conservation and Attractions, meaning that is rare or near threatened.

References

adenotricha
Eudicots of Western Australia
Proteales of Australia
Taxa named by Donald McGillivray
Plants described in 1986